Laredo Kid (born December 30, 1986) is a Mexican luchador enmascarado, or masked professional wrestler. He is currently signed to both Impact Wrestling and Lucha Libre AAA Worldwide, but is currently inactive due to abdominal surgery.

Laredo Kid's real name is not a matter of public record, as is often the case with masked wrestlers in Mexico where private lives are kept a secret from wrestling fans. Laredo Kid originally used the ring name The Exterminador but changed it to "Laredo Kid" after a year. He signed with AAA in 2005 and worked for them for several years before leaving the promotion to work on the Mexican Independent circuit.

Professional wrestling career
The wrestler that would later be known as Laredo Kid made his professional wrestling debut in 2003, under the name "Exterminador". He would often wrestle against his brother "Oscuridad" and would work alongside his uncle and trainer Muerte Subita (also known as "El Hechicero"). He worked on the Mexican Independent circuit until early 2005.

Asistencia Asesoría y Administración (2005–2011)
After signing with Asistencia Asesoría y Administración (AAA) in 2005 he was repackaged as "Laredo Kid", named after his home town of Nuevo Laredo, Tamaulipas. Laredo Kid's first notable appearance for AAA was at the 2005 Verano de Escandalo where he teamed up with Los Barrio Boys (Alan, Billy Boy and Decniss) in a loss to Gran Apache and the Black Family (Cuervo, Escoria and Ozz). In December 2005 Laredo Kid teamed with Hombre sin Miedo, Principe Zafiro and Rey Cometa in a loss to Kaoma Jr., Oscuridad (Laredo Kid's brother), Rio Bravo and Tito Santana at the 2005 Guerra de Titanes. Subsequently Laredo Kid and Hombre sin Miedo teamed up to win the Taumalipas State tag team championship. Following Guerra de Titanes Laredo Kid and Rey Cometa was joined by Super Fly, Nemesis, Pegasso and Aero Star to form the group Real Fuerza Aérea, a group of colorful, masked young high fliers.

On March 10, 2006, Real Fuerza Aérea made their first appearance as a group at a major AAA event when Laredo Kid, Super Fly and Nemesis lost to Los Diabolicos (Angel Mortal, Mr. Condor and Gallego) at the 2006 Rey de Reyes show. Three months later Real Fuerza Aérea (this time consisting of Laredo Kid, Nemesis, Super Fly and Rey Cometa) challenged the Black Family (Chessman, Cuervo, Escoria and Ozz) for the Mexican National Atómicos Championship at Triplemanía XIV. The match ended in a "No contest", causing the championship to be declared vacant. At a subsequent television taping the Black Family defeated Real Fuerza Aérea and reclaim the title.

In the fall of 2006 AAA held a tournament called Luchando Por un Sueño, or "the Dream Tournament" in English where low and mid-card wrestlers competed in a 12-man single elimination tournament. Laredo Kid defeated Mr. Condor in the opening round and Pesadilla in the semi-finals to earn a spot in the finals as the 2006 Verano de Escandalo. On September 17, 2006 Laredo Kid defeated both Kaoma, Jr. and Gran Apache to win the Luchando Por un Sueño tournament, the only one of its kind so far. At the 2006 Guerra de Titanes Laredo Kid along with El Brazo, Jr., El Ángel and El Elegido lost to Los Vipers (Abismo Negro, Antifaz, Charly Manson and Histeria).

Laredo Kid was one of the participants in the original Alas de Oro (Spanish for "Wings of Gold"), but was eliminated by eventual winner Extreme Tiger. At Triplemanía XV Laredo Kid and Gran Apache defeated Super Fly and Super Caló in a Relevos Suicidas tag team match. Losing the match forced Super Fly to wrestle Super Calo in a Lucha de Apuesta, mask vs. mask match. In August 2008 Laredo Kid, along with El Oriental, Histeria and Antifaz traveled to Japan to compete on Pro Wrestling Noah's 2007 "Shiny Navigation" tour that ran over ten events from August 19, 2007 until September 2, 2009. On most nights Laredo Kid teamed with El Oriental against Histeria and Antifaz, sometimes in six-man matches teaming with Ricky Marvin while Histeria and Antifaz teamed with Rocky Romero. On September 3, 2009 on the last night in Japan Laredo Kid teamed with Super Fly to defeat Atsushi Aoki and Ippei Ota on a joint AAA/NOAH show called TripleSEM. Two weeks later Latin Lover, La Parka and Ricky Marvin to defeat the La Legión Extranjera team of Abismo Negro, Ron Killings, Kenzo Suzuki and X-Pac in one of the feature matches on the 2007 Verano de Escandalo event. Laredo Kid got the winning pinfall on X-Pac, Laredo Kid's biggest win to date.

At the 2007 Antonio Peña Memorial Show Laredo Kid suffered a severe leg injury during a match. He was participating in the Copa Antonio Peña Gauntlet match, wrestling Ron Killings when a Huracanrana off the top rope went wrong and Killings landed on Laredo Kid's leg, breaking it. The injury kept Laredo Kid out of the ring until early 2008.

Laredo Kid returned from his injury in early 2008, in time to join "Team AAA", El Alebrije, Charly Manson and Chavo Guerrero, Sr. at the 2008 Rey de Reyes losing to La Legión Extranjera (Electroshock, Kenzo Suzuki, Sabu and Scott Steiner). On April 14, 2008 Laredo Kid wins his first Lucha de Apuesta, or bet match when a multiman Steel Cage Match came down to him and Jaque Mate with Laredo Kid pinning Jaque Mate, forcing him to have his head shaved after the match. In June 2008 Laredo Kid re-injured his leg during a Lucha de Apuestas match because the steel rod in his leg had not been inserted properly. The match saw Sangre Chicana sacrifice his hair to save the injured Laredo Kid's mask. The injury kept Laredo Kid out of the ring, halting his momentum as both Super Fly and Aero Star became the focus of Real Fuerza Aérea while he was away and continued to work higher profile matches than Laredo Kid after he returned to the ring.

Laredo Kid was one of the 13 competitors in a Domo De La Muerte (Dome of Death) match to determine the competitors in a tournament to crown the first ever AAA Cruiserweight Champion. Laredo Kid defeated Super Fly in the first round but lost to Alan Stone in the semi-final.

WWE (2015)
On April 7, 2015, Laredo Kid wrestled a tryout match for WWE, which he worked unmasked under the ring name Tony Guevara. Teaming with Sammy Guevara, the two were defeated by Los Matadores.

Impact Wrestling (2017–2018, 2019, 2021–present)
On the March 30, 2017 episode of Impact Wrestling, Laredo Kid made his debut. He teamed up with Garza Jr. in a tag team tournament for the Impact Wrestling world tag team championships. on the June 28, 2019 episode of Impact Wrestling, Laredo Kid and Latin American Exchange (Ortiz & Santana) lost to The Rascalz (Dez, Trey & Wentz). On the July 5 episode of Impact Wrestling, Laredo Kid lost to Rohit Raju. On the September 9, 2021 episode of Impact Wrestling Before The Impact, Laredo Kid defeated John Skyler. On the September 16 episode of Impact Wrestling, Laredo Kid lost to John Skyler. At Victory Road (2021), Laredo Kid defeated Black Taurus, Jake Something, John Skyler, and Trey Miguel in a Five-way scramble match. On the September 23 episode of Impact Wrestling Before The Impact, Laredo Kid defeated John Skyler. On the September 30 episode of Impact Wrestling, Laredo Kid competed in the first round of the Impact X Division Championship Tournament where he lost to Trey Miguel. On the October 7 episode of Impact Wrestling Before The Impact, Laredo Kid defeated Matthew Rehwoldt. At Bound for Glory, Laredo Kid competed in the Call Your Shot Gauntlet match which was won by Moose. At Turning Point, Laredo Kid competed in a Three-way match for the Impact X Division Championship which was won by Trey Miguel.

All Elite Wrestling (2019, 2021)
On June 29, Kid made a special appearance at the first AEW Fyter Fest event, replacing Pac teaming with Lucha Brothers (Pentagón Jr. and Rey Fénix), who were defeated by The Elite (Kenny Omega, Matt Jackson and Nick Jackson). On the March 24, 2021 episode of AEW Dynamite, Laredo Kid made his return to team with Lucha Brothers to take on Brandon Cutler and The Young Bucks.

In other media
In the late summer of 2019, Laredo Kid was one of the participants in the Mexican version of the Exathlon sports reality show, Laredo Kid was part of the "celebrity/athlete" Exathlon team, competing against a team of amateurs that was shown several days a week on the Mexican Azteca Uno television station.

Championships and accomplishments

Llaves y Candados
 LyC Cruiserweight Championship (1 time, current)
Lucha Libre AAA Worldwide
AAA World Cruiserweight Championship (1 time)
AAA World Trios Championship (1 time) – with El Hijo del Vikingo and Myzteziz Jr.
Lucha Capital (2018 Men's)
Rey de Reyes (2021)
Luchando Por un Sueño tournament
 Maximum Assault Wrestling
 MAW Championship (1 time)
Pro Wrestling Illustrated
 Ranked No. 22 of the top 500 singles wrestlers in the PWI 500 in 2021
Pro Wrestling Blitz
PWB Tag Team Championship (1 time) – with Garza Jr.
World Wrestling League
WWL Americas Championship (1 time)
Other championships
Tamaulipas State Tag Team Championship (1 time) – with Hombre Sin Miedo

Luchas de Apuestas record

Footnotes

References

External links

 AAA profile

1983 births
Living people
Mexican male professional wrestlers
Masked wrestlers
Unidentified wrestlers
Professional wrestlers from Tamaulipas
Sportspeople from Nuevo Laredo
21st-century professional wrestlers
AAA World Cruiserweight Champions
AAA World Trios Champions